Craig Richard McKinley (born May 6, 1952) is a retired United States Air Force general who served as the 26th Chief of the National Guard Bureau, serving from 2008 to 2012. He is the first officer from the National Guard to ever achieve the grade of a four-star general.

Prior to becoming chief, he served as the Director, Air National Guard from May 2006 to November 17, 2008.  He retired after being succeeded by Frank J. Grass on September 7, 2012. At the ceremony where he transferred authority to his successor, McKinley received the Defense Distinguished Service Medal and Homeland Security Distinguished Service Medal.  McKinley's official retirement date was  November 1, 2012.

Military career
McKinley received his commission in 1974 as a distinguished graduate of the Air Force Reserve Officer Training Corps program at Southern Methodist University. He served in numerous assignments in flying and operations, as well as command positions at group, wing, sector and field operating agency levels. He also served as Commander, First Air Force and Commander, Continental United States North American Aerospace Defense Command Southeast Region, Tyndall Air Force Base, Florida. McKinley is a command pilot with over 4,000 flight hours, primarily in the T-38 Talon, F-106 Delta Dart, F-16 Fighting Falcon and F-15 Eagle. Additionally, McKinley has been pilot in command in the C-131 Samaritan and C-130 Hercules Operational Support Airlift aircraft.

As Chief of the National Guard Bureau, McKinley was the senior uniformed officer of the National Guard of the United States, and the state National Guard, responsible for formulating, developing and coordinating all policies, programs and plans affecting more than half a million federalized and nonfederalized Army National Guard and Air National Guard personnel. Appointed by the president, he served as the principal adviser to the Secretary of the Army, Chief of Staff of the Army, the Secretary of the Air Force, and the Chief of Staff of the Air Force. He also served as the principal National Guard adviser to Secretary of Defense through the Chairman of the Joint Chiefs of Staff on all National Guard issues. As National Guard Bureau Chief, he served as the army's and air force's official channel of communication with state governors and Adjutants General concerning state National Guards.

Education

Assignments

 December 1974 – November 1975, student, undergraduate pilot training, Moody AFB, Georgia
 November 1975 – March 1977, T-38 instructor pilot, Craig AFB, Alabama
 March 1977 – May 1979, equal opportunity and treatment officer, Air Force Military Training Center, Lackland AFB, Texas
 May 1979 – November 1980, T-38 instructor pilot, Laughlin AFB, Texas
 November 1980 – April 1986, F-106 alert pilot, 125th Fighter Interceptor Group, Jacksonville ANGB, Florida.
 April 1986 – June 1987, Chief of Safety, 125th Fighter Interceptor Wing, Jacksonville ANGB, Florida
 June 1987 – April 1989, F-16 instructor pilot, 125th Fighter Wing, Jacksonville ANGB, Florida.
 April 1989 – May 1990, Chief of Standardization and Evaluation, 125th Fighter Wing, Jacksonville ANGB, Florida
 May 1990 – May 1991, Deputy Commander for Operations, 125th Fighter Wing, Jacksonville ANGB, Florida
 May 1991 – May 1994, Commander, 125th Fighter Wing, Jacksonville ANGB, Florida
 May 1994 – June 1995, student, National War College, Fort Lesley J. McNair, Washington, D.C.
 June 1995 – March 1996, Commander, 125th Fighter Wing, Jacksonville ANGB, Florida
 March 1996 – July 1996, Air National Guard Vice Commander, Southeast Air Defense Sector, Tyndall AFB, Florida
 July 1996 – January 1998, Commander, Southeast Air Defense Sector, Tyndall AFB, Florida
 January 1998 – February 2001, Deputy Director, Air National Guard, Arlington, Virginia, and Commander, Air National Guard Readiness Center, Andrews AFB, Maryland
 March 2001 – July 2002, Deputy Inspector General of the Air Force, Office of the Secretary of the Air Force, Washington, D.C.
 August 2002 – October 2004, Commander, 1st Air Force (1 AF) of Air Combat Command, and Commander, Continental U.S. North American Aerospace Defense Command Region, Tyndall AFB, Florida.
 November 2004 – November 2005, Director, Mobilization and Reserve Affairs Directorate, U.S. European Command, Stuttgart-Vaihingen, Germany
 November 2005 – May 2006, Assistant Deputy Chief of Staff for Plans and Programs, Headquarters U.S. Air Force, Washington, D.C.
 May 2006 – November 2008, Director, Air National Guard, Arlington, Virginia
 November 2008 – September 2012, Chief, National Guard Bureau, Arlington, Virginia

Flight information

Awards and decorations

Other achievements

Effective dates of promotion

References

External links

|-

1952 births
Living people
Harvard University alumni
Recipients of the Defense Distinguished Service Medal
Recipients of the Homeland Security Distinguished Service Medal
Recipients of the Air Force Distinguished Service Medal
Recipients of the Legion of Merit
Southern Methodist University alumni
United States Air Force generals
National Guard (United States) generals
Recipients of the Order of the Sword (United States)
Recipients of the Defense Superior Service Medal
Chiefs of the National Guard Bureau
Webster University alumni
Recipients of the Meritorious Service Medal (United States)
Recipients of the Humanitarian Service Medal